Every team has to submit a roster of 16 players.

Algeria
2016 African Handball Championship - 4th place   Head coach:  Salah Bouchekriou

Angola
2016 African Handball Championship - Bronze medal   Head coach:  Filipe Cruz

Cameroon
2016 African Handball Championship - 5th place   Head coach:  Honoré Konguep

Congo

DR Congo

Egypt
2016 African Handball Championship - Gold medal   Head coach:  Marwan Ragab

Gabon
2016 African Handball Championship - 11th place Head coach: ?

Kenya

Libya

Morocco
2016 African Handball Championship - 6th place   Head coach:  Noureddine Bouhaddioui

Nigeria

Tunisia
2016 African Handball Championship - Silver medal   Head coach:  Sylvain Nouet

References

External links

African Handball Federation

African handball championships
Handball squads